Euptychia picea is a species of butterfly in the family Nymphalidae. It is found in Brazil (Amazonas), Peru and Suriname.

References

Butterflies described in 1867
Euptychiina
Fauna of Brazil
Nymphalidae of South America
Taxa named by Arthur Gardiner Butler